Alteramenelikia is a genus of moths of the family Zygaenidae, containing only one species, Alteramenelikia jordani. It is known from the Democratic Republic of the Congo and Ethiopia.

References

Procridinae
Moths of Africa
Insects of Ethiopia
Monotypic moth genera
Zygaenidae genera